Alexandru Ionuț Vodă (born 22 July 1998) is a Romanian professional footballer who plays as a midfielder for Liga I club FC U Craiova. Vodă made his debut at senior level for CS Pandurii Târgu Jiu, in the Liga II.

References

External links
 
 
 Alexandru Vodă at lpf.ro

1998 births
Living people
Sportspeople from Craiova
Romanian footballers
Association football midfielders
Liga I players
FC Hermannstadt players
Liga II players
CS Pandurii Târgu Jiu players
CSC 1599 Șelimbăr players
FC U Craiova 1948 players